Alfredo Siniscalchi (22 February 1885 – 3 March 1954) was the 2nd Italian governor of Addis Ababa. He was born in Naples, Kingdom of Italy. He died in Rome, Italy.

References

1885 births
1954 deaths
19th-century Neapolitan people
Italian expatriates in Ethiopia